, formerly known as , is a subscription-based video streaming service owned by CyberAgent's subsidiary CyberFight. On October 24, 2016, DDT Owner Sanshiro Takagi came down to the ring prior to that day's event and announced that DDT would be debuting their own video-on-demand service, called DDT Universe, in January 2017. Some major DDT events air live on the service, which also features matches from the promotion's archives, dating back to 2004, as well as matches from DDT's affiliate and sister promotions DNA (DDT New Attitude), Pro-Wrestling Basara, Tokyo Joshi Pro Wrestling, Union Pro Wrestling and Ganbare Pro Wrestling. As well as full shows and matches, the promotion also features documentaries showcasing the lives of wrestlers outside the ring. On January 30, 2020, DDT Universe began airing content from sister company Pro Wrestling Noah. On May 12, DDT Universe was rebranded as Wrestle Universe to reflect that the service offers content from different promotions.

See also

 All Japan Pro Wrestling TV
 Club WWN
 New Japan Pro-Wrestling World
 Impact Plus
 UFC Fight Pass
 WWE Network
 Honor Club

References

External links 
 

 
 
 
 

Internet television channels
DDT Pro-Wrestling
Pro Wrestling Noah
Tokyo Joshi Pro-Wrestling
CyberAgent
Internet properties established in 2017
2017 establishments in Japan
Video on demand services
Professional wrestling streaming services
Shinjuku